The Furze are a British indie band from Maidenhead, Berkshire, England.  The members of the band have been recording together for more than ten years, and the same line-up have previously performed under the name Kid Galahad.  The band’s current name is a reference to Furze Platt, the suburb of Maidenhead where all the members hail from.  Their music style has been compared to that of Beck and Jane's Addiction.
The band have supported a number of prominent bands and artists at concerts around the world, including Marillion, Kaiser Chiefs, Supergrass, Oasis, Kings of Leon and Elliott Smith. The band have bemoaned the lack of live music venues and outlets for local talent in the Maidenhead area, and as a result have invested in Denmark Studios in the town.

Kid Galahad
The four band members met in 1997, whilst they all attended Furze Platt School in Maidenhead. The band honed their skills in live performances and homemade recordings.  One of their early demos was given to long-time friend and DJ, James Lavelle, who championed the band, along with the independent Ignition record label, whom the band signed to in 2000. Their recordings for the label were produced by Jim Abbiss (who had previously worked with The Music, DJ Shadow and UNKLE amongst others), and the band’s first studio release was the Stealin' Beats EP in May 2001.  As well as Abbiss' work on the title track, this EP also contained two live tracks and an original demo recorded in lead singer Ash’s back garden.  This EP was made "single of the week" by NME magazine and BBC Radio 1.

Kid Galahad’s second release was the Where’s my Gold? EP in July 2001.  Like its predecessor, this EP showed off the band’s eclectic style and mixed studio and live recordings, and was also given a single of the week stamp of approval, this time by MTV.  Finally, a trio of limited edition EP releases was completed in November 2001, with the release of the Runaway Train EP.  These releases also coincided with the band touring with bands such as Vex Red, Tetra Splendour and The Electric Soft Parade.

Kid Galahad’s debut album Gold Dust Noise was released on 20 May 2002.  The album was critically well received, though some journalists regarded the album with a little disappointment given the strength of the EPs previously released. A further single "Swimming to Shore" was released on 10 June 2002 to promote the album, however the album failed to make the Top 100 on the UK album chart.

Splitting from Ignition records, the band took some time off to work on some new songs and the soundtrack to the film Happily Even After.  These two albums were both released in 2006 on the Three-Sixty record label.  The first album, The Bedroom Tapes, was released on 20 Feb 2006, and was described as "experiments in stereo recording". The film soundtrack was released later in June the same year.

These albums were released without any publicity from the members of the band, only a statement on the record label website stating that the band had gone missing in Cornwall, "All that was found in the car was a pair of Wallace and Gromit Boxer shorts and a tape in the player of their Triumph Herald."
This story facilitated the transformation and relaunch of the band as The Furze.

To mark this re-branding of the band, just a month after the final Kid Galahad release, the first single by The Furze, "Carry me Home" was released on Three-Sixty records.  This was followed in March 2007 by the single "I'm on Fire" and then the album Subterranean Kicks in May 2007.  The press release suggesting the band had gone missing in Cornwall may have also have been a reference to the fact that the band went to the Sawmills Studios on the banks of the River Fowey to record Subterranean Kicks.

Music use in other media
"Stealin' Beats" was used in the Konami PS2 game Dancing Stage MegaMix, which sold more than 500,000 copies world-wide.
A number of Kid Galahad tracks were used in the UK comedy drama Teachers, including "Stealin Beats" (series two, episode two), "Distant Sunshine" and "Pack it In" (series two, episode five), "Runaway Train" (series two, episode eight), "I Don't Wanna Play" (series three, episode one), "Distant Sunshine" (series three, episode two) and "Swimming to Shore" (series three, episode four).

Current projects
In 2007 the band decided to put proceedings on hold to pursue new projects. Dave Ody released a solo album through Line Out Records called Geen and in 2008 formed the band Mothboxer with Phil Davies and Jon Hawes – ex Mother Black Cap and Robbie Burley – ex Pearl Kites. The band played a few select gigs in London and the South East in 2008 and 2009
The Mothboxer debut album was released in 2010, followed by Frequency in 2011 and Three was released in 2012 along with Death Valley Blue in 2013 on US label Three Sixty Records.
Singer Ash Bull, as well as running a successful Recording and rehearsal studio in Maidenhead, Berkshire, formed a new band – Me and The Beast, featuring Wooky on drums as well as singer Carly Cunningham and Damien Bidmead on Bass. After winning Live & Unsigned the group disbanded.
Ash Bull and Damian Bidmead went on to form Sometimes King with Julian Gabriah.  The band commenced recording their debut album in 2014/15 with anticipated release October 2015
Small rumblings of the Kid G/Furze machinery started to materialize in 2012 as the re-issued Skeleton EP appeared on bandcamp.com as well as the rare self released singles "I Don't Belong" and "Up In Arms".

Discography

Albums
As Kid Galahad
 2002 – Gold Dust Noise
 2006 – Happily Even After
 2006 – The Bedroom Tapes
As The Furze
 2007 – Subterranean Kicks

Singles/EPs
As Kid Galahad
 2001 – "Stealin' Beats EP"
 2001 – "Where's my Gold? EP"
 2001 – "Runaway Train EP"
 2002 – "Swimming to Shore"
As The Furze
 2006 – "Carry me Home"
 2007 – "I'm on Fire"

References

Musical groups from Berkshire
English indie rock groups
People from Maidenhead
Ignition Records artists